Bae Soo-bin (born Yoon Tae-wook on December 9, 1976), is a South Korean actor. He is best known for his roles in the television dramas Brilliant Legacy, Temptation of an Angel, 49 Days, and Dong Yi. He also starred in the films Girlfriends, The Way - Man of the White Porcelain, 26 Years, and Mai Ratima.

Personal life
Bae married his girlfriend, a graduate student, on September 14, 2013. His wife gave birth to their first child, a boy, on June 14, 2014. In December 2020, Bae revealed that he divorced his non-celebrity wife last year after 6 years of marriage.

Filmography

Film

Television series

Variety show

Music video

Theater

Awards and nominations

References

External links

  
 Bae Soo-bin at BH Entertainment 
 
 
 

1976 births
Living people
Male actors from Seoul
South Korean male models
21st-century South Korean male actors
South Korean male film actors
South Korean male television actors
South Korean Buddhists